Siberia is an extensive geographical region, constituting all of North Asia, from the Ural Mountains in the west to the Pacific Ocean in the east. It has been a part of Russia since the latter half of the 16th century, after the Russians conquered lands east of the Ural Mountains. Novosibirsk, Omsk, and Chelyabinsk are the largest cities in the region.

Because Siberia is a geographic and historic region and not a political entity, there is no single precise  definition of its territorial borders. Traditionally, Siberia extends eastwards from the Ural Mountains to the Pacific Ocean, and includes most of the drainage basin of the Arctic Ocean. The river Yenisey divides Siberia into two parts, Western and Eastern. Siberia stretches southwards from the Arctic Ocean to the hills of north-central Kazakhstan and to the northern parts of Mongolia and China. The central part of Siberia (West and East Siberian economic regions) was considered the core part of the region in the Soviet Union. Beyond the core, Siberia's western part includes some territories of the Ural region, and the far eastern part has been historically called the Russian Far East.

Siberia is known worldwide primarily for its long, harsh winters, with a January average of −25 °C (−13 °F). It is geographically situated in Asia; however, having been colonized and incorporated into Russia, it is culturally and politically a part of Europe. European cultural influences, specifically Russian, predominate throughout the region, due to it having had Russian emigration from Europe since the 16th century, forming the Siberian Russian sub-ethnic group. Over 85% of the region's population is of European descent.

Etymology
The origin of the name is unknown. Some sources say that "Siberia" originates from the Siberian Tatar word for "sleeping land" (Sib ir). The modern usage of the name was recorded in the Russian language after the Russian conquest of Siberian Khanate. A further variant claims that the region was named after the Sibe people. The Polish historian Chyliczkowski has proposed that the name derives from the proto-Slavic word for "north" (север, sever), same as Severia. Anatole Baikaloff has dismissed this explanation. He said that the neighbouring Chinese, Turks, and Mongolians, who have similar names for the region, would not have known Russian. He suggests that the name might be a combination of two words with Turkic origin, "su" (water) and "bir" (wild land).

History

Prehistory

The Siberian Traps were formed by one of the largest-known volcanic events of the last 251 million years of Earth's geological history. Their activity continued for a million years and some scientists consider it a possible cause of the "Great Dying" about 250 million years ago, – estimated to have killed 90% of species existing at the time.

The region has paleontological significance, as it contains bodies of prehistoric animals from the Pleistocene Epoch, preserved in ice or in permafrost. Specimens of Goldfuss cave lion cubs, Yuka the mammoth and another woolly mammoth from Oymyakon, a woolly rhinoceros from the Kolyma, and bison and horses from Yukagir have been found. Remote Wrangel Island and the Taymyr Peninsula are believed to have been the last places on Earth to support woolly mammoths as isolated populations until their extinction around 2000 BC.

At least three species of human lived in Southern Siberia around 40,000 years ago: H. sapiens, H. neanderthalensis, and the Denisovans.
In 2010 DNA evidence identified the last as a separate species. 

Late Paleolithic southern Siberians appear to be related to paleolithic Europeans and the paleolithic Jōmon people of Japan. Ancient DNA analysis has revealed that the oldest fossil known to carry the derived KITLG allele, which is responsible for blond hair in modern Europeans, is a 17,000 year old Ancient North Eurasian specimen from Siberia. Ancient North Eurasian populations genetically similar to Mal'ta–Buret' culture and Afontova Gora were an important genetic contributor to Native Americans, Europeans, Ancient Central Asians, South Asians, and some East Asian groups (such as the Ainu people). Evidence from full genomic studies suggests that the first people in the Americas diverged from Ancient East Asians about 36,000 years ago and expanded northwards into Siberia, where they encountered and interacted with Ancient North Eurasians, giving rise to both Paleosiberian peoples and Ancient Native Americans, which later migrated towards the Beringian region, became isolated from other populations, and subsequently populated the Americas.

Early history

During past millennia different groups of nomads – such as the Enets, the Nenets, the Huns, the Xiongnu, the Scythians, and the Yugur inhabited various parts of Siberia. The Afanasievo and Tashtyk cultures of the Yenisey valley and Altay Mountains are associated with the Indo-European migrations across Eurasia. The proto-Mongol Khitan people also occupied parts of the region. In the 13th century, during the period of the Mongol Empire, the Mongols conquered a large part of this area.

With the breakup of the Golden Horde, the autonomous Khanate of Sibir formed in the late-15th century. Turkic-speaking Yakut migrated north from the Lake Baikal region under pressure from the Mongol tribes during the 13th to 15th century. Siberia remained a sparsely populated area. Historian John F. Richards wrote: "... it is doubtful that the total early modern Siberian population exceeded 300,000 persons".

The growing power of Russia in the West began to undermine the Siberian Khanate in the 16th century. First, groups of traders and Cossacks began to enter the area. The Russian Army was directed to establish forts farther and farther east to protect new Russian settlers who migrated from Europe. Towns such as Mangazeya, Tara, Yeniseysk, and Tobolsk developed, the last becoming the de facto capital of Siberia from 1590. At this time, Sibir was the name of a fortress at Qashliq, near Tobolsk. Gerardus Mercator, in a map published in 1595, marks Sibier both as the name of a settlement and of the surrounding territory along a left tributary of the Ob. Other sources contend that the Sibe, an indigenous Tungusic people, offered fierce resistance to Russian expansion beyond the Urals. Some suggest that the term "Siberia" is a russification of their ethnonym.

Russian Empire

By the mid-17th century, Russia had established areas of control that extended to the Pacific Ocean. Some 230,000 Russians had settled in Siberia by 1709. Siberia became one of the destinations for sending internal exiles. Exile was the main Russian punitive practice with more than 800,000 people exiled during the nineteenth century.

The first great modern change in Siberia was the Trans-Siberian Railway, constructed during 1891–1916. It linked Siberia more closely to the rapidly industrialising Russia of Nicholas II. Around seven million Russians moved to Siberia from Europe between 1801 and 1914. Between 1859 and 1917 more than half a million people migrated to the Russian Far East. Siberia has extensive natural resources: during the 20th century, large-scale exploitation of these took place, and industrial towns cropped up throughout the region.

At 7:15 a.m. on 30 June 1908 the Tunguska Event felled millions of trees near the Podkamennaya Tunguska (Stony Tunguska) in central Siberia. Most scientists believe this resulted from the air burst of a meteor or a comet. Even though no crater has ever been found, the landscape in the (sparsely inhabited) area still bears the scars of this event.

Soviet Union

In the early decades of the Soviet Union (especially in the 1930s and 1940s), the government used the Gulag state agency to administer a system of penal labour camps, replacing the previous katorga system. According to semi-official Soviet estimates, which did not become public until after the fall of the Soviet government in 1991, from 1929 to 1953 more than 14 million people passed through these camps and prisons, many of them in Siberia. Another seven to eight million people were internally deported to remote areas of the Soviet Union (including entire nationalities or ethnicities in several cases).

Half a million (516,841) prisoners died in camps from 1941 to 1943 during World War II. At other periods, mortality was comparatively lower. The size, scope, and scale of the Gulag slave-labour camps remain subjects of much research and debate. Many Gulag camps operated in extremely remote areas of northeastern Siberia. The best-known clusters included Sevvostlag (the North-East Camps) along the Kolyma and Norillag near Norilsk, where 69,000 prisoners lived in 1952. Major industrial cities of Northern Siberia, such as Norilsk and Magadan, developed from camps built by prisoners and run by former prisoners.

Geography

It geographically falls in Asia, but is culturally and politically considered European, since it is a part of Russia. Major geographical zones within Siberia include the West Siberian Plain and the Central Siberian Plateau.

Eastern and central Sakha comprises numerous north–south mountain ranges of various ages. These mountains extend up to almost , but above a few hundred metres they are almost completely devoid of vegetation. The Verkhoyansk Range was extensively glaciated in the Pleistocene, but the climate was too dry for glaciation to extend to low elevations. At these low elevations are numerous valleys, many of them deep and covered with larch forest, except in the extreme north where the tundra dominates. Soils are mainly turbels (a type of gelisol). The active layer tends to be less than one metre deep, except near rivers.

The highest point in Siberia is the active volcano Klyuchevskaya Sopka, on the Kamchatka Peninsula. Its peak reaches .

Mountain ranges

 Altai Mountains
 Anadyr Highlands
 Baikal Mountains
 Khamar-Daban
 Chersky Range
 Chukotka Mountains
 Dzhugdzhur Mountains
 Kolyma Mountains
 Koryak Mountains
 Sayan Mountains
 Tannu-Ola Mountains
 Ural Mountains
 Verkhoyansk Mountains
 Yablonoi Mountains

Geomorphological regions

 Central Siberian Plateau
 Central Yakutian Lowland
 East Siberian Lowland
 East Siberian Mountains
 North Siberian Lowland
 South Siberian Mountains
 West Siberian Lowland

Lakes and rivers

 Alazeya
 Anabar
 Angara
 Indigirka
 Irtysh
 Kolyma
 Lake Baikal
 Lena
 Nizhnyaya Tunguska
 Novosibirsk Reservoir
 Ob
 Podkamennaya Tunguska
 Popigay
 Upper Angara
 Uvs Nuur
 Yana
 Yenisey

Grasslands
 Ukok Plateau—part of a UNESCO World Heritage Site

Geology
The West Siberian Plain, consisting mostly of Cenozoic alluvial deposits, is somewhat flat. In the mid-Pleistocene, many deposits on this plain resulted from ice dams which produced a large glacial lake. This mid- to late-Pleistocene lake blocked the northward flow of the Ob and Yenisey rivers, resulting in a redirection southwest into the Caspian and Aral seas via the Turgai Valley. The area is very swampy, and soils are mostly peaty histosols and, in the treeless northern part, histels. In the south of the plain, where permafrost is largely absent, rich grasslands that are an extension of the Kazakh Steppe formed the original vegetation, most of which is no longer visible.

The Central Siberian Plateau is an ancient craton (sometimes named Angaraland) that formed an independent continent before the Permian (see the Siberian continent). It is exceptionally rich in minerals, containing large deposits of gold, diamonds, and ores of manganese, lead, zinc, nickel, cobalt, and molybdenum. Much of the area includes the Siberian Traps—a large igneous province. A massive eruptive period approximately coincided with the Permian–Triassic extinction event. The volcanic event is said to be the largest known volcanic eruption in Earth's history. Only the extreme northwest was glaciated during the Quaternary, but almost all is under exceptionally deep permafrost, and the only tree that can thrive, despite the warm summers, is the deciduous Siberian Larch (Larix sibirica) with its very shallow roots. Outside the extreme northwest, the taiga is dominant, covering a significant fraction of the entirety of Siberia. Soils here are mainly turbels, giving way to spodosols where the active layer becomes thicker and the ice-content lower.

The Lena-Tunguska petroleum province includes the Central Siberian platform (some authors refer to it as the "Eastern Siberian platform"), bounded on the northeast and east by the Late Carboniferous through Jurassic Verkhoyansk foldbelt, on the northwest by the Paleozoic Taymr foldbelt, and on the southeast, south and southwest by the Middle Silurian to Middle Devonian Baykalian foldbelt. A regional geologic reconnaissance study begun in 1932 and followed by surface and subsurface mapping revealed the Markova-Angara Arch (anticline). The Sredne-Botuobin Gas Field was discovered in 1970, producing from the Osa and the Proterozoic Parfenovo Horizon.

Climate

The climate of Siberia varies dramatically, but it typically has short summers and long, brutally cold winters. On the north coast, north of the Arctic Circle, there is a very short (about one month long) summer.

Almost all the population lives in the south, along the route of the Trans-Siberian Railway. The climate in this southernmost part is humid continental climate (Köppen Dfb) with cold winters but fairly warm summers lasting at least four months. With a reliable growing season, an abundance of sunshine and exceedingly fertile chernozem soils, southern Siberia is good enough for profitable agriculture, as was demonstrated in the early 20th century.

The business-oriented website and blog Business Insider lists Verkhoyansk and Oymyakon, in Siberia's Sakha Republic, as being in competition for the title of the Northern Hemisphere's Pole of Cold. Each town is alternately considered the Northern Hemisphere's Pole of Cold – the coldest inhabited point in the Northern hemisphere.

Southwesterly winds bring warm air from Central Asia and the Middle East. The climate in West Siberia (Omsk, or Novosibirsk) is several degrees warmer than in the East (Irkutsk, or Chita) where in the north an extreme winter subarctic climate (Köppen Dfd or Dwd) prevails. But summer temperatures in other regions can reach . In general, Sakha is the coldest Siberian region, and the basin of the Yana has the lowest temperatures of all, with permafrost reaching . Nevertheless,  Imperial Russian plans of settlement never viewed cold as an impediment. In the winter, southern Siberia sits near the center of the semi-permanent Siberian High, so winds are usually light in the winter.

Precipitation in Siberia is generally low, exceeding  only in Kamchatka, where moist winds flow from the Sea of Okhotsk onto high mountains – producing the region's only major glaciers, though volcanic eruptions and low summer temperatures allow only limited forests to grow. Precipitation is high also in most of Primorye in the extreme south, where monsoonal influences can produce quite heavy summer rainfall.

Global warming
Researchers, including Sergei Kirpotin at Tomsk State University and Judith Marquand at Oxford University, warn that Western Siberia has begun to thaw as a result of global warming. The frozen peat bogs in this region may hold billions of tons of methane gas, which may be released into the atmosphere. Methane is a greenhouse gas 22 times more powerful than carbon dioxide. In 2008 a research expedition for the American Geophysical Union detected levels of methane up to 100 times above normal in the atmosphere above the Siberian Arctic, likely the result of methane clathrates being released through holes in a frozen "lid" of seabed permafrost around the outfall of the Lena and the area between the Laptev Sea and East Siberian Sea.

Since 1988, experimentation at Pleistocene Park has proposed to restore the grasslands of prehistoric times by conducting research on the effects of large herbivores on permafrost, suggesting that animals, rather than climate, maintained the past ecosystem. The nature reserve park also conducts climatic research on the changes expected from the reintroduction of grazing animals or large herbivores, hypothesizing that a transition from tundra to grassland would lead to a net change in energy emission to absorption ratios.

According to Vasily Kryuchkov, approximately 31,000 square kilometers of the Russian Arctic has subjected to severe environmental disturbance.

Fauna

Birds

Order Galliformes

Family Tetraonidae
 Hazel grouse
 Siberian grouse
 Black grouse
 Black-billed capercaillie
 Western capercaillie
 Willow ptarmigan
 Rock ptarmigan

Family Phasianidae
 Daurian partridge
 Grey partridge
 Altai snowcock
 Japanese quail
 Common quail
 Ring-necked pheasant

Mammals

Order Artiodactyla
 Moose
 Bactrian camel
 Wisent (European bison)
 Red deer
 Wild boar
 Siberian roe deer
 Manchurian wapiti
 Siberian musk deer

Order Carnivora

Family Canidae
 Grey wolf
 Tundra wolf
 Arctic fox
 Red fox

Family Felidae
 Snow leopard
 Amur leopard
 Siberian tiger
 Eurasian lynx
 Pallas cat

Family Mustelidae
 Least weasel
 Stoat
 Mountain weasel
 Siberian weasel
 Steppe polecat
 Sable
 Eurasian river otter
 Asian badger
 Wolverine

Family Ursidae
 Asian black bear
 Brown bear
 Polar bear

Flora

 Larix sibirica
 Larix gmelinii
 Picea obovata
 Pinus pumila

Politics

Notable sovereign states in Siberia
 Xianbei state (1st–3rd century CE)
 First Turkic Khaganate (6th–7th century)
 Eastern Turkic Khaganate (7th century)
 Second Turkic Khaganate (7th–8th century)
 Mongol Empire (13th–14th century)
 Khanate of Sibir (1468–1598)
 Tsardom of Russia (1598–1721)
 Russian Empire (1721–1917)
 Russian Republic (1917–1918)
 Russian Socialist Federative Soviet Republic (1918–1922)
 Far Eastern Republic (1920–1922)
 Tuvan People's Republic (1921–1944)
 Soviet Union (1922–1991)
 Russian Soviet Federative Socialist Republic (1922–1991)
 Russian Federation (1991–present)

Borders and administrative division

The term "Siberia" has both a long history and wide significance, and association. The understanding, and association of "Siberia" have gradually changed during the ages. Historically, Siberia was defined as the whole part of Russia and North Kazakhstan to the east of Ural Mountains, including the Russian Far East. According to this definition, Siberia extended eastward from the Ural Mountains to the Pacific coast, and southward from the Arctic Ocean to the border of Central Asia and the national borders of both Mongolia and China.

Soviet-era sources (Great Soviet Encyclopedia and others) and modern Russian ones usually define Siberia as a region extending eastward from the Ural Mountains to the watershed between Pacific and Arctic drainage basins, and southward from the Arctic Ocean to the hills of north-central Kazakhstan and the national borders of both Mongolia and China. By this definition, Siberia includes the federal subjects of the Siberian Federal District, and some of the Ural Federal District, as well as Sakha (Yakutia) Republic, which is a part of the Far Eastern Federal District. Geographically, this definition includes subdivisions of several other subjects of Urals and Far Eastern federal districts, but they are not included administratively. This definition excludes Sverdlovsk Oblast and Chelyabinsk Oblast, both of which are included in some wider definitions of Siberia.

Other sources may use either a somewhat wider definition that states the Pacific coast, not the watershed, is the eastern boundary (thus including the whole Russian Far East), as well as all Northern Kazakhstan is its subregion in the south-west or a somewhat narrower one that limits Siberia to the Siberian Federal District (thus excluding all subjects of other districts). In Russian, 'Siberia' is commonly used as a substitute for the name of the federal district by those who live in the district itself, but less commonly used to denote the federal district by people residing outside of it. Due to the different interpretations of Siberia, starting from Tyumen, to Chita, the territory generally defined as 'Siberia', some people will define themselves as 'Siberian', while others not.

A number of factors in recent years, including the fomenting of 'Siberian separatism' have made the definition of the territory of Siberia a potentially controversial subject. In the eastern extent of Siberia there are territories which are not clearly defined as either Siberia or the Far East, making the question of 'what is Siberia?' one with no clear answer, and what is a 'Siberian', one of self-identification.

Major cities
The most populous city of Siberia, as well as the third most populous city of Russia, is the city of Novosibirsk. Present-day Novosibirsk is an important business, science, manufacturing and cultural center of the Asian part of Russia.

Omsk played an important role in the Russian Civil War serving as a provisional Russian capital, as well in the expansion into and governing of Central Asia. In addition to its cultural status, it has become a major oil-refining, education, transport and agriculture hub.

Other historic cities of Siberia include Tobolsk (the first capital and the only kremlin in Siberia), Tomsk (formerly a wealthy merchant's town) and Irkutsk (former seat of Eastern Siberia's governor general, near lake Baikal).

Other major cities include: Barnaul, Kemerovo, Krasnoyarsk, Novokuznetsk, Tyumen.

Wider definitions of geographic Siberia also include the cities of: Chelyabinsk and Yekaterinburg in the Urals, Khabarovsk and Vladivostok in the Russian Far East, and even Petropavlovsk in Kazakhstan and Harbin in China.

Economy

Novosibirsk is the largest by population and the most important city for the Siberian economy; with an extra boost since 2000 when it was designated a regional center for the executive bureaucracy (Siberian Federal District). Omsk is a historic and currently the second largest city in the region, and since 1950s hosting Russia's largest oil refinery.

Siberia is extraordinarily rich in minerals, containing ores of almost all economically valuable metals. It has some of the world's largest deposits of nickel, gold, lead, coal, molybdenum, gypsum, diamonds, diopside, silver and zinc, as well as extensive unexploited resources of oil and natural gas. Around 70% of Russia's developed oil fields are in the Khanty-Mansiysk region. Russia contains about 40% of the world's known resources of nickel at the Norilsk deposit in Siberia. Norilsk Nickel is the world's biggest nickel and palladium producer.

Siberian agriculture is severely restricted by the short growing season of most of the region. However, in the southwest where soils consist of exceedingly fertile black earths and the climate is a little more moderate, there is extensive cropping of wheat, barley, rye and potatoes, along with the grazing of large numbers of sheep and cattle. Elsewhere food production, owing to the poor fertility of the podzolic soils and the extremely short growing seasons, is restricted to the herding of reindeer in the tundra—which has been practiced by natives for over 10,000 years. Siberia has the world's largest forests. Timber remains an important source of revenue, even though many forests in the east have been logged much more rapidly than they are able to recover. The Sea of Okhotsk is one of the two or three richest fisheries in the world owing to its cold currents and very large tidal ranges, and thus Siberia produces over 10% of the world's annual fish catch, although fishing has declined somewhat since the collapse of the USSR in 1991.

Reported in 2009, the development of renewable energy in Russia is held back by the lack of a conducive government policy framework, Siberia still offers special opportunities for off-grid renewable energy developments. Remote parts of Siberia are too costly to connect to central electricity and gas grids, and have therefore historically been supplied with costly diesel, sometimes flown in by helicopter. In such cases renewable energy is often cheaper.

In 2020 the gross regional product of Siberia was 26.7 trillion ₽ or around US$400 billion.

Sport

The Yenisey Krasnoyarsk basketball team has played in the VTB United League since 2011–12.

Russia's third most popular sport, bandy, is important in Siberia. In the 2015–16 Russian Bandy Super League season Yenisey from Krasnoyarsk became champions for the third year in a row by beating Baykal-Energiya from Irkutsk in the final. Two or three more teams (depending on the definition of Siberia) play in the Super League, the 2016–17 champions SKA-Neftyanik from Khabarovsk as well as Kuzbass from Kemerovo and Sibselmash from Novosibirsk. In 2007 Kemerovo got Russia's first indoor arena specifically built for bandy. Now Khabarovsk has the world's largest indoor arena specifically built for bandy, Arena Yerofey. It was venue for Division A of the 2018 World Championship. In time for the 2020 World Championship, an indoor arena will be ready for use in Irkutsk. That one will also have a speed skating oval.

The 2019 Winter Universiade was hosted by Krasnoyarsk.

Demographics

According to the Russian Census of 2010, the Siberian and Far Eastern Federal Districts, located entirely east of the Ural Mountains, together have a population of about 25.6 million. Tyumen and Kurgan Oblasts, which are geographically in Siberia but administratively part of the Urals Federal District, together have a population of about 4.3 million. Thus, the whole region of Siberia (in the broadest usage of the term) is home to approximately 30 million people. It has a population density of about three people per square kilometre.

The largest ethnic group in Siberia is Slavic-origin Russians, including their sub-ethnic group Siberians, and russified Ukrainians. Slavic and other Indo-European ethnicities make up the vast majority (over 85%) of the Siberian population. There are also other groups of indigenous Siberian and non-indigenous ethnic origin. A minority of the current population are descendants of Mongol or Turkic people (mainly Buryats, Yakuts, Tuvans, Altai and Khakas) or northern indigenous people. Slavic-origin Russians outnumber all of the indigenous peoples combined, except in the Republics of Tuva and Sakha.

According to the 2002 census there are 500,000 Tatars in Siberia, but of these, 300,000 are Volga Tatars who also settled in Siberia during periods of colonization and are thus also non-indigenous Siberians, in contrast to the 200,000 Siberian Tatars which are indigenous to Siberia. Of the indigenous Siberians, the Mongol-speaking Buryats, numbering approximately 500,000, are the most numerous group in Siberia, and they are mainly concentrated in their homeland, the Buryat Republic. According to the 2010 census there were 478,085 indigenous Turkic-speaking Yakuts. Other ethnic groups indigenous to Siberia include Kets, Evenks, Chukchis, Koryaks, Yupiks, and Yukaghirs.

About seventy percent of Siberia's people live in cities, mainly in apartments. Many people also live in rural areas, in simple, spacious, log houses. Novosibirsk is the largest city in Siberia, with a population of about 1.6 million. Tobolsk, Tomsk, Tyumen, Krasnoyarsk, Irkutsk, and Omsk are the older, historical centers.

Religion

There are a variety of beliefs throughout Siberia, including Orthodox Christianity, other denominations of Christianity, Tibetan Buddhism and Islam. The Siberian Federal District alone has an estimation of 250,000 Muslims.
An estimated 70,000 Jews live in Siberia, some in the Jewish Autonomous Region. The predominant religious group is the Russian Orthodox Church.

Tradition regards Siberia the archetypal home of shamanism, and polytheism is popular. These native sacred practices are considered by the tribes to be very ancient. There are records of Siberian tribal healing practices dating back to the 13th century. The vast territory of Siberia has many different local traditions of gods. These include: Ak Ana, Anapel, Bugady Musun, Kara Khan, Khaltesh-Anki, Kini'je, Ku'urkil, Nga, Nu'tenut, Num-Torum, Pon, Pugu, Todote, Toko'yoto, Tomam, Xaya Iccita and Zonget. Places with sacred areas include Olkhon, an island in Lake Baikal.

Transport
Many cities in northern Siberia, such as Petropavlovsk-Kamchatsky, cannot be reached by road, as there are virtually none connecting from other major cities in Russia or Asia. Siberia can be reached through the Trans-Siberian Railway. The Trans-Siberian Railway operates from Moscow in the west to Vladivostok in the east. Cities that are located far from the railway are reached by air or by the separate Baikal–Amur Railway (BAM).

Culture

Cuisine
Stroganina is a raw fish dish of the indigenous people of northern Arctic Siberia made from raw, thin, long-sliced frozen fish. It is a popular dish with native Siberians. Siberia is also known for its pelmeni dumpling; which in the winter are traditionally frozen and stored outdoors. In addition, there are various berry, nut and mushroom dishes making use of the riches of abundant nature.

See also

Siberian regionalism
Tunguska Basin

References

Bibliography

 Nicholas B. Breyfogle, Abby Schrader and Willard Sunderland (eds), Peopling the Russian Periphery: Borderland Colonization in Eurasian history (London, Routledge, 2007).

 James Forsyth, A History of the Peoples of Siberia: Russia's North Asian Colony, 1581–1990 (Cambridge, Cambridge University Press, 1994).

 
 Steven G. Marks, Road to Power: The Trans-Siberian Railroad and the Colonization of Asian Russia, 1850–1917 (London, I.B. Tauris, 1991).

 Igor V. Naumov, The History of Siberia. Edited by David Collins (London, Routledge, 2009) (Routledge Studies in the History of Russia and Eastern Europe).

 Alan Wood (ed.), The History of Siberia: From Russian Conquest to Revolution (London, Routledge, 1991).

 
North Asia
Eurasian Steppe
Geography of Russia
Regions of Russia
Geography of Kazakhstan